Campo de São Paulo is a multi-use stadium located in Bairro dos Congolenses, Luanda, Angola.  The stadium has a capacity of 5,000 people, and previously hosted Girabola (Angolan national football league) matches prior to falling into disuse and disrepair.  In 2017, the Angolan Football Federation acquired the stadium with plans to convert it to a training center for Angola's national football teams.

References

Buildings and structures in Luanda
São Paulo